The Berlin Chess Championship is an annual chess tournament in Germany. The first unofficial Berlin Chess Championship was held in 1853, and Jean Dufresne won a match against Max Lange.
Since 1904, official Berlin championships have taken place. The first event was won by Horatio Caro, followed by Ossip Bernstein, Rudolf Spielmann, Wilhelm Cohn, Benjamin Blumenfeld, etc.
 
As a result of the post-war division of the city into East Berlin and West Berlin, from 1953 until 1990 two separate championships were held. 
Since the 1991 reunification of Germany, the Berlin championships are again held as single events.

Berlin Champions
{| class="sortable wikitable"
! Year !! Winner
|-
|1904 ||  Horatio Caro
|-
|1905 ||  Horatio Caro, Moritz Lewitt
|-
|1906 ||  Erich Cohn
|-
|1908 ||  Wilhelm Cohn
|-
|1909 ||  Moritz Lewitt
|-
|1910 ||  Richard Teichmann
|-
|1911 ||  Carl Ahues
|-
|1919 ||  Karl Stephan
|-
|1920 ||  Ernst Schweinburg
|-
|1921 ||  Willi Schlage
|-
|1922 ||  Kurt Richter
|-
|1923 ||  Kurt Richter
|-
|1924 ||  Carl Ahues, Richard Teichmann
|-
|1925 ||  Friedrich Sämisch
|-
|1926 ||  Willi Schlage
|-
|1927 ||  Berthold Koch
|-
|1928 ||  Karl Helling
|-
|1929 ||  Carl Ahues, Kurt Richter
|-
|1930 ||  Kurt Richter, Ludwig Rellstab, Simon Rotenstein
|-
|1932 ||  Karl Helling
|-
|1933 ||  Kurt Richter, Berthold Koch
|-
|1934 ||  Carl Ahues, Friedrich Sämisch
|-
|1935 ||  Efim Bogoljubow, Kurt Richter
|-
|1936 ||  Kurt Richter
|-
|1937 ||  Ludwig Rellstab
|-
|1938 ||  Kurt Richter
|-
|1939 ||  Franz Mölbitz
|-
|1940 ||  Rudolf Palme
|-
|1941 ||  Ludwig Rellstab
|-
|1942 ||  Josef Grammatikoff
|-
|1943 ||  Rudolf Teschner
|-
|1944 ||  Rudolf Teschner
|-
|1946 ||  Berthold Koch
|-
|1947 ||  Rudolf Teschner
|-
|1948 ||  Kurt Richter
|-
|1949 ||  Gerhard Pfeiffer
|-
|1950 ||  Rudolf Teschner
|-
|1951 ||  Berthold Koch
|-
|1952 ||  Rudolf Teschner
|}

West Berlin and East Berlin Champions
{| class="sortable wikitable"
! Year !! West Berlin Winner !! East Berlin Winner
|-
| 1953  || Rudolf Teschner || 
|-
| 1954  || Klaus Darga || 
|-
| 1955  || Klaus Uwe Müller ||
|-
| 1956  || Heinz Lehmann ||
|-
| 1957  || Rudolf Teschner ||
|-
| 1958  || Wolfram Bialas ||  Werner Golz
|-
| 1959  || Klaus Darga ||
|-
| 1960  || Alfred Seppelt ||  Bodo Starck 
|-
| 1961  || Hans-Joachim Hecht ||  Hermann Brameyer
|-
| 1962  || Wolfram Bialas || Klaus Tiemer
|-
| 1963  || Harald Lieb || Alfred Barwich
|-
| 1964  || Adolf Delander ||
|-
| 1965  || Hans-Joachim Hecht || Hermann Brameyer
|-
| 1966  || Adolf Delander || Lothar Kollberg
|-
| 1967  || Jürgen Dueball || Hermann Brameyer
|-
| 1968  || Harald Lieb || Franz Stahl
|-
| 1969  || Hans-Joachim Hecht || Bodo Starck
|-
| 1970  || Harald Lieb || Bodo Starck
|-
| 1971  || Werner Reichenbach || Bodo Starck
|-
| 1972  || Harald Lieb || Wolfgang Rohde
|-
| 1973  || Harald Lieb || Hans-Jürgen Meißner
|-
| 1974  || Werner Reichenbach || Bodo Starck
|-
| 1975  || Horst Bach || Friedrich Baumbach
|-
| 1976  || Werner Reichenbach || Lothar Kollberg
|-
| 1977  || Harald Lieb || Joachim Fechner
|-
| 1978  || Wolfgang Riedel || Wolfgang Thormann
|-
| 1979  || Norbert Sprotte || Lothar Kollberg
|-
| 1980  || Michael Bilek || Jörg Seils
|-
| 1981  || Harald Lieb || Wolfgang Thormann
|-
| 1982  || no contest || Ralf Rennoch
|-
| 1983  || Frank Grzesik || Bodo Starck
|-
| 1984  || no contest || Bodo Starck
|-
| 1985  || Mladen Muse || Alexander Okrajek
|-
| 1986  || no contest || Jörg Seils
|-
| 1987 || Mladen Muse || Alexander Okrajek
|-
| 1988 || Steve Brooke || Wolfgang Rohde
|-
| 1989 || Mladen Muse || Jörg Seils
|-
| 1990 ||  no contest  || Matthias Schöwel 
|}

Berlin Champions
{| class="sortable wikitable"
! Year !! Winner
|-
| 1991 ||  Jörg Seils
|-
| 1993 ||  Jörg Seils
|-
| 1994 ||  Alexander Lagunow
|-
| 1995 ||  Alexander Lagunow
|-
| 1996 ||  Alexander Lagunow
|-
| 1997 ||  Robert Rabiega
|-
| 1998 ||  Manfred Glienke
|-
| 1999 ||  Ulf von Herman
|-
| 2000 ||  Robert Rabiega
|-
| 2001 ||  Ulf von Herman
|-
| 2002 ||  Sergey Kalinitschew
|- 
| 2003 ||  Jakov Meister
|- 
| 2004 ||  Jakov Meister
|- 
| 2005 ||  Jakov Meister
|- 
| 2006 ||  Ulf von Herman
|- 
| 2007 ||  Jakob Meister
|- 
| 2008 ||  Ulf von Herman
|-
| 2009 ||  Ulf von Herman
|-
| 2010 ||  René Stern
|-
| 2011 ||  René Stern
|-
| 2012 ||  René Stern
|- 
| 2013 ||  Sergey Kalinitschew
|- 
| 2014 ||  René Stern
|- 
| 2015 ||  Sergey Kalinitschew, Hendrik Möller
|- 
| 2016 ||  
|- 
| 2017 ||  
|- 
| 2018 ||  Atila Gajo Figura
|- 
| 2019 ||  Johannes Florstedt 
|- 
| 2020-2021 || no championship
|- 
| 2022 ||  Johannes Florstedt 
|}

References

Chess competitions
Chess in Germany
Berlin Chess Championship
1904 in chess
1904 establishments in Germany
Recurring events established in 1904
Annual events in Berlin